Laughing in the Sunshine (Swedish: Ett kungligt äventyr) is a 1956 British-Swedish romance film directed by Daniel Birt and starring Jane Hylton, Bengt Logardt and Adolf Jahr. It was Birt's final film. It is sometimes alternatively described as a British-Danish co-production. It was shot at the Centrumateljéerna Studios in Stockholm and on location around the city. The film's sets were designed by the art director Nils Nilsson.

Synopsis
Princess Caroline arrives in Stockholm wish to travel incognito and encounters Prince Birger who is also in disguise.

Cast
 Jane Hylton as Princess Caroline  
 Bengt Logardt as Prince Birger  
 Adolf Jahr as Sniska  
 Jean Anderson as Diana Masefield  
 Peter Dyneley as Greg Preston  
 Marjorie Fielding as Lady Preston  
 Nils Kihlberg as Aide  
 Arne Källerud as Waiter 
 Torsten Lilliecrona as Policeman  
 Stanley Maxted as J G Parker
 Ragnar Arvedson  as Footman
 Gösta Prüzelius as Man  
 Georg Skarstedt as Man

References

Bibliography
 Chibnall, Steve & McFarlane, Brian. The British 'B' Film. Palgrave MacMillan, 2009.
 Soila, Tytti. The Cinema of Scandinavia. Wallflower Press, 2005.

External links

1956 films
British romantic drama films
Swedish romantic drama films
English-language Swedish films
Films directed by Daniel Birt
1950s English-language films
1950s Swedish-language films
Films shot in Stockholm
Films set in Stockholm
United Artists films
1950s British films
1950s Swedish films